The Waterside Street Bridge is a historic bridge, carrying Waterside Street across an inlet of Lake Number 1 in North Little Rock, Arkansas. It is a rustic closed-spandrel masonry structure, with an exterior of rough uncoursed fieldstone that rises to parapet above the side of the roadbed. It is one of four masonry bridges built between 1929 and 1939 by developer Justin Matthews as part of the Lakewood subdivision.

The bridge was listed on the National Register of Historic Places in 1990.

See also
List of bridges documented by the Historic American Engineering Record in Arkansas
List of bridges on the National Register of Historic Places in Arkansas
National Register of Historic Places listings in Pulaski County, Arkansas

References

External links

Historic American Engineering Record in Arkansas
Road bridges on the National Register of Historic Places in Arkansas
Bridges completed in 1935
Buildings and structures in North Little Rock, Arkansas
Stone bridges in the United States
National Register of Historic Places in Pulaski County, Arkansas
Transportation in Pulaski County, Arkansas
1935 establishments in Arkansas